The 1931 Tipperary Senior Hurling Championship was the 41st staging of the Tipperary Senior Hurling Championship since its establishment by the Tipperary County Board in 1887.

Toomevara were the defending champions.

Toomevara won the championship after a 5-04 to 2-00 defeat of Moycarkey-Borris in the final. It was their ninth championship title overall and their second title in succession.

References

Tipperary
Tipperary Senior Hurling Championship